God's Spy is an upcoming Belgian-Irish historical drama film, written, directed and produced by Todd Komarnicki.

Synopsis
Set in Berlin during the 1940s, it tells the true story German theologian and pastor Dietrich Bonhoeﬀer, who stood up to the Nazis during the Third Reich.

Cast
Jonas Dassler as Dietrich Bonhoeffer
Phileas Heyblom as young Dietrich 
Flula Borg as Hans Dohnanyi
David Jonsson
August Diehl as Martin Niemoller
Moritz Bleibtreu as Karl Bonhoeffer
Clarke Peters

Production
Komarnicki discussed shooting the film in 2018 describing it as a “profound and pretty untold story of heroism from World War II.”

In January 2023, Jonas Dassler was confirmed in the role of Dietrich Bonhoeffer and Flula Borg, David Jonsson, August Diehl, Moritz Bleibtreu and Clarke Peters were confirmed as cast. Production was by In Plain Sight Group, Crow’s Nest Productions, and Fontana. Acclaimed cinematographer John Mathieson and production designer John Beard were also revealed to be on-board the project.

Filming
Principal photography took place in Ireland in locations such as Limerick, County Clare, Tipperary, and St Fin Barre's Cathedral in Cork. Filming also took place in Belgium, in Brussels, and Spa. According to Variety filming wrapped before March 2023.

References

External links
 

Upcoming films
American World War II films
Anti-war films about World War II
Films shot in the Republic of Ireland
Films shot in Belgium
Films shot in Brussels
Films shot in County Clare
Films shot in County Cork
Films set in Berlin